Jasem is both a given name and a surname. Notable people with the name include:

Given name
 Jasem Yaqoub, An outstanding Kuwaiti football player who scored 36 international goals in 49 matches for his national team.
 Jasem Amiri, Iranian wrestler
 Jasem Delavari, Iranian amateur boxer
 Jasem Al Huwaidi, Kuwaiti footballer
 Jasem Sadeghi, Iranian footballer

Surname
 Mahir Jasem, Emirati footballer

See also
 Jassem, a city in southern Syria

Arabic-language surnames
Arabic masculine given names